The Central Texas League was a minor league baseball league that played from 1914 to 1917. The Central Texas League played as a six–team Class D level league and consisted of teams based exclusively in Texas. The Central Texas League never completed a full season in its four seasons of play and was sometimes called the Central Texas Trolley League. The Ennis Tigers played in each season of the league, which had a different champion each season.

History
The Central Texas League began play in 1914, as a six–team Class D level minor league, with all six franchises based in Texas. The first league president was A.M. Frazier. The Corsicana Athletics, Ennis Tigers, Hillsboro, Texas, Italy, Texas, Waxahachie Buffaloes and West, Texas teams were the charter franchises. The league was also known informally as the Central Texas Trolley League in its inception.

In their first season of league play, the league played a split schedule. After Central Texas League games began on May 10, 1914, the second half was shortened when the league ceased play on July 25, 1914. After the league stopped play the Central Texas League did have a playoff. The Waxahachie Buffaloes won the first half standings (26–15) and West won the shortened second half standings. In the playoff, the Waxahachie Buffaloes won the championship when they defeated West 3 games to 2.

In 1915, the Central Texas League reformed and the league began play on May 17, 1915 with six members. The six teams in 1915 were the Corsicana A's, Ennis Tigers, Kaufman Kings, Mexia Gassers, Terrell Cubs and Waxahachie Athletics. The 1915 league presidents were Earl C. Brown and Hulen P. Robertson. The league folded on July 24, 1915. The Ennis Tigers won the first half of the schedule. The Mexia Gassers won the second half of the schedule. No playoffs were held and Ennis had the best overall record at 35–26, 3.0 games ahead of the Corsicana A's.

The Central Texas League formed again and began play on April 28, 1916. The six league members in 1916 were the Ennis Tigers, Marlin Marlins, Mexia Gassers, Temple Governors, Terrell Terrors and Waxahachie Athletics. The 1916 league presidents were Earl C. Brown and Jack C. Castellaw. The league disbanded July 16, 1916. At 36–25, the Temple Governors had the best overall record, 1.0 game ahead of the Ennis Tigers, who finished with a 35–26 record.

The Central Texas League played its final season in 1917. The league dropped two franchises and began play in 1917 as a four–team league before permanently folding before the season was completed. The Central Texas League began play on May 21, 1917 with the Ennis Tigers, Marlin Marlins, Mexia Gassers and Temple Governors as the four league members. The league president was Earl C. Smith. On June 1, 1917, the Temple Governors franchise, with a 4–4 record moved to become the Corsicana Athletics. On June 6, 1917 the Central Texas League permanently folded. The Mexia Gassers had the best overall record at 8–6 when the league folded. No playoffs were held.

Central Texas League teams

Standings & statistics

1914 Central Texas League
Season ended July 25. Playoff: Waxahachie 3 games, West 2.

1915 Central Texas League
League disbanded July 24.

1916 Central Texas League
League disbanded July 16.

1917 Central Texas League
League disbanded June 6

Baseball Hall of Fame alumni
Ross Youngs, (1915) Waxahachie Athletics, Inducted 1972

References

External links
 Baseball Reference

Defunct minor baseball leagues in the United States
Baseball leagues in Texas
Defunct professional sports leagues in the United States
Sports leagues established in 1914
Sports leagues disestablished in 1917
1914 establishments in Texas
1917 disestablishments in Texas